The Barrow Way is a long-distance trail in Ireland. It is typically completed in four days. It is designated as a National Waymarked Trail by the National Trails Office of the Irish Sports Council and is managed by Waterways Ireland. 

The trail starts in Robertstown and follows the Barrow Line Canal, a branch of the Grand Canal, as far as Athy via the towns of Rathangan and Monasterevin. The section from Robertstown to Rathangan once formed part of the now defunct Kildare Way. At Athy, the Way joins the River Barrow and follows its banks to St Mullin's, taking in the towns of Carlow, Leighlinbridge, Muine Bheag, Goresbridge, Borris and Graiguenamanagh. 

The Barrow Way connects with the Grand Canal Way at Robertstown. It also shares its route with that of the South Leinster Way between Borris and Graiguenamanagh. 	

A review of the National Waymarked Trails in 2010 found usage by multiday walkers to be moderate and usage by day walkers to be high. The Barrow Way is often done by way of a series of out and back excursions rather than as one continuous walk. The review recommended consideration be given to developing sections as a cycle route. The review also recommended that the Barrow Way be designated as a National Waterway Trail as it falls into the category of trails that follow the towpaths of inland waterways.

References

Notes

Bibliography

External links
 Barrow Valley Guide at 
 Barrow Way at RiverBarrow.net
 Barrow Way at IrishTrails.ie
 Barrow Way at Fáilte Ireland
 River Barrow Walks at the Inland Waterways Association of Ireland

Long-distance trails in the Republic of Ireland
Geography of County Kildare
Geography of County Laois
Geography of County Kilkenny
Geography of County Carlow
Tourist attractions in County Kildare
Tourist attractions in County Laois
Tourist attractions in County Kilkenny
Tourist attractions in County Carlow